Maglia is a surname. Notable people with the surname include:

Gianluca Maglia (born 1988), Italian swimmer
Veronica Maglia (born 1989), Swiss footballer

Surnames of Italian origin